William Henry Duke Jr. (born February 26, 1943) is an American actor and film director. Known for his physically imposing frame, Duke works primarily in the action and crime drama genres often as a character related to law enforcement. Frequently a character actor, he has starred opposite Arnold Schwarzenegger in Commando and Predator, and has appeared in films like American Gigolo, No Man's Land, Bird on a Wire, Menace II Society, Exit Wounds, Payback, X-Men: The Last Stand, and Mandy. In television, he is best known as Agent Percy Odell in Black Lightning.

He has directed episodes of numerous television series including Cagney & Lacey,  Dallas, Hill Street Blues, Miami Vice, The Twilight Zone, and American Playhouse. He has also directed the crime films Deep Cover and A Rage in Harlem, for which he was nominated for a Palme d'Or, as well as the comedy Sister Act 2.

Early life and education
Duke was born in Poughkeepsie, New York, the son of Ethel Louise (née Douglas) and William Henry Duke Sr. He attended Franklin D. Roosevelt High School in Hyde Park and later received his first instruction in the performing arts and in creative writing at Dutchess Community College in Poughkeepsie. Duke worked menial jobs seven days a week to cover his living expenses and intended to halt his education until Dr. James Hall, a DCC Dean gave Duke a personal check to cover room, board and books for his next three years at Boston University, where (Duke) had secured an academic-based scholarship, intending to pursue medical school after graduation, to please his parents. "My room smelled like formaldehyde." He later switched to English Education and then instruction in dance and drama for the completion of his B.A.

Duke then graduated work at New York University's Tisch School of the Arts. Unable to secure quite enough acting working, he pan-handled, as well as shop-lifted groceries. He did, however, appear on Broadway in the 1971 Melvin Van Peebles musical Ain't Supposed to Die a Natural Death. With acting roles dried up, Duke next attended AFI Conservatory to study filmmaking.

Career

Film roles
Standing at an imposing  and with a closely shaved head, Duke first became a familiar face to moviegoers in Car Wash (1976), where he portrayed fierce young Black Muslim revolutionary Abdullah Mohammed Akbar (formerly known as Duane). He expanded his repertoire with American Gigolo (1980), where he played a gay pimp, who co-orchestrates a murder, pinned on star Richard Gere.

As the action-film-oriented genre became more popular, Duke portrayed a string of tough guys. He worked opposite Arnold Schwarzenegger with a small role in Commando. Then he acted alongside Schwarzenegger, Carl Weathers and Jesse Ventura in the scifi action thriller Predator, followed by a role as a police chief in the 1988 Carl Weathers vehicle Action Jackson. 
Duke appeared uncredited as a DEA officer in The Limey (1999), as well as a police chief opposite Steven Seagal in Exit Wounds. In Menace II Society (1993), he played a police investigator who tricks the main character into contradicting himself during an interrogation, then tries to rattle him by repeating the line, "You done fucked up, you know that, don't you?" The line became often-quoted. He played a corrupt law enforcement agent in two films opposite Mel Gibson—Bird on a Wire (as an FBI agent) and Payback (as a police detective). Duke appeared as Trask in X-Men: The Last Stand, Washington in National Security, Levar in Get Rich or Die Tryin', Nokes in Bad Country and Caruthers in Mandy.

Directing career
In the early 1980s, Duke accidentally secured a directing job on Knots Landing, due to a secretarial or clerical error at AFI Conservatory. However, the producers were pleased with his work, and he was kept on, eventually directing 10 episodes of the show. This made him one of the first four black television directors. Duke then directed episodes of Knots Landing'''s mother show Dallas and its sister show Falcon Crest (6 episodes). Next came action and cop shows Hill Street Blues, Miami Vice and Starman. He credits the benevolence and humanity of people like Larry Hagman and Jane Wyman for his early TV directing success, while he occasionally heard derogatory remarks, and even racial slurs, from crew members, including the Teamsters.

Duke directed the TV movie The Killing Floor in 1984. He began directing theatrical films in the 1990s with crime dramas A Rage in Harlem (1991), Deep Cover (1992)  and Hoodlum (1997). He also directed The Cemetery Club (1993) and the Whoopi Goldberg comedy sequel Sister Act 2: Back in the Habit (1993).

For television, Duke directed the A&E Network original film, The Golden Spiders: A Nero Wolfe Mystery (2000). In 2007 he directed the historical reenactments in the award-winning PBS-broadcast documentary Prince Among Slaves.

Duke teamed with screenwriter Bayard Johnson to co-produce Cover, a 2007 film which explores the HIV epidemic.

He is set to direct The Power of One: The Diane Latiker Story, a film based on Chicago activist Diane Latiker.

Television appearances
Duke made an appearance on Kojak in 1976, as Sylk in the episode "Bad Dude", in the third season of the series. He guest-starred in the fourth episode of Lost in its third season as Warden Harris, in the episode "Every Man for Himself".

Duke had a starring role in the short-lived TV series Palmerstown, U.S.A., produced by Norman Lear and Roots author, Alex Haley. Although the series was critically acclaimed and won an Emmy, it ran for only 17 episodes in the 1980–81 television season.

He guest-starred in Battlestar Galactica remake in 2004, the season two episode "Black Market".

Duke was cast as recurring character Capt. Parish in the action television series/crime drama Fastlane. He made a guest appearance on Baisden After Dark in the episode broadcast on July 18, 2008 and guest-starred on Cold Case as Grover Boone, a corrupt politician, in the 2008 episode "Street Money". Duke voiced a detective in the episode "Thank You for Not Snitching" of the animated television series The Boondocks. The character and his entire scene were references to Menace II Society. Duke appears in Busta Rhymes' music video "Dangerous". Duke also appears in an episode of Law & Order: SVU as a lawyer. In May 2017, Duke appeared on episode 6 of the first season of the Outdoor Channel show Hollywood Weapons: Fact or Fiction?. Duke discussed with host Terry Schappert his time filming Predator, his character Sgt. Mac Elliot, and what it was like to fire an M134 Minigun.

In 2018, Duke joined the second season of The CW superhero drama series Black Lightning as recurring character Agent Percy Odell, a dedicated A.S.A. government official.

Other work
He has served on the board of trustees of the American Film Institute, as a member of the California Film Commission board, appointed by Governor Schwarzenegger, in the Time Warner Endowed Chair in the Department of Radio Television and Film at Howard University in Washington, D.C. and as a member of the National Endowment for the Humanities, appointed by President Bill Clinton.

In 2011 he directed the documentary Dark Girls, which was nominated for an NAACP Award, followed by 2015's Light Girls.

Duke is also the founder & owner of the Duke Media Foundation that helps prepare young people for a career in all aspects of film, video and TV production. Duke became a teacher of Transcendental Meditation in Ethiopia in 1973 under the guidance of Maharishi Mahesh Yogi.

Personal life
Duke has been married to Shelia P. Moses.

, Duke resides in Los Angeles.

Duke is an honorary member of the Phi Beta Sigma fraternity.

Filmography

Film

Television

Films directed

References

External links
 
 Official website at the Internet Archive
 
  about The Golden Spiders: A Nero Wolfe Mystery''
 Interview with Bill Duke – The Spectrum, November 16, 2018.

1943 births
20th-century American male actors
21st-century American male actors
African-American film directors
African-American male actors
African-American television directors
American male film actors
American male television actors
American television directors
Boston University College of Fine Arts alumni
Film directors from New York (state)
Living people
Male actors from New York (state)
People from Poughkeepsie, New York
Tisch School of the Arts alumni
Dutchess Community College alumni